Fuquay Springs Historic District is a national historic district located at Fuquay-Varina, Wake County, North Carolina.  The districts encompasses 36 contributing buildings and 1 contributing site in the town of Fuquay-Varina.  The predominantly residential district developed between about 1899 and 1946, and includes notable examples of Queen Anne, Colonial Revival, Tudor Revival, and Bungalow / American Craftsman architecture.  Located in the district are the separately listed Ben-Wiley Hotel and Fuquay Mineral Spring.  Other notable buildings include the Varina Mercantile Building (1899), Barham Hotel (c. 1908), Ballentine-Spence House (c. 1910, 1927), Barbour-Perkins House (c. 1928), Proctor House (1925), and Harold Johnson House (1938).

It was listed on the National Register of Historic Places in 1996, with a boundary increase in 2014.

References

Historic districts on the National Register of Historic Places in North Carolina
Queen Anne architecture in North Carolina
Colonial Revival architecture in North Carolina
Tudor Revival architecture in North Carolina
Buildings and structures in Wake County, North Carolina
National Register of Historic Places in Wake County, North Carolina